A Short Album About Love is the fifth studio album by Irish chamber pop band the Divine Comedy, released in 1997 by Setanta Records. It was recorded on 20 October 1996 at Shepherd's Bush Empire, London.

Release and reception

"Everybody Knows (Except You)" was released as a single on three separate CDs, each one featuring an extra three live tracks. It became one of the band's biggest hits, reaching No. 14 in the UK charts. The album was included in the book 1001 Albums You Must Hear Before You Die.

Track listing
All songs written by Neil Hannon except where stated.

European edition bonus tracks

"Birds of Paradise Farm" is a studio recording, produced by Darren Allison and Hannon, during the Casanova album sessions, and as such, features a completely different line-up to the band heard on the rest of the album, with Allison playing drums and percussion, Hannon playing "everything else", and strings/woodwinds recorded at Abbey Road Studios. "Birds of Paradise Farm" had previously appeared as a B-side of the "Something for the Weekend" single.
 "Love Is Lighter Than Air" and "Motorway to Damascus" are also studio recordings, this time featuring the newly formed, post-Casanova, core live Divine Comedy band. Both tracks had also appeared as B-sides to Casanova-era singles: "Something for the Weekend" and "Becoming More Like Alfie", respectively.

In other media
The middle eight of "In Pursuit of Happiness" was subsequently adopted as the theme for the TV series Tomorrow's World. The original version was used for one season of the show, with a specially-recorded version being substituted thereafter.

Personnel
The Divine Comedy
Neil Hannon – vocals, guitar
Ivor Talbot – guitar
Bryan Mills – bass guitar
Joby Talbot – piano, orchestral arrangements
Stuart "Pinkie" Bates – Hammond organ
Miguel Barradas – drums

The Brunel Ensemble
Simon Baggs – violin, orchestra leader
Lisa Betteridge, Kate Birchall, Krista Juanita Caspersz, Emily Davis, Benjamin Harte, Mary Martin, Timothy Myall, Benjamin Nabarro, Juliet Warden – violins
Yannick Dondelinger, Zoe Lake, Jong On Lau, John Murphy – violas
Betsy Taylor, Robbie Jacobs, Douncan Moulton – celli
Peter Devlin, Philip Dawson – double basses
Max Spiers – oboe
Charlotte Glasson – saxophone, flute
Matthew Gunner – horn
Simon Jones – trumpet
Adam Howard – trumpet, flugelhorn
Jane Butterfield – trombone
Robert Farrer – percussion
Christopher Austin – conductor

References

1997 albums
The Divine Comedy (band) albums
Setanta Records albums
Orchestral pop albums